Enneapterygius trisignatus is a species of triplefin blenny in the genus Enneapterygius. It was described by Ronald Fricke in 2001. It is found off northern New Caledonia.

References

trisignatus
Fish described in 2001